Notley High School & Braintree Sixth Form is situated in Braintree in Essex, England. The school was built in the early 1970s.

Notley High School was an 11–16 school until September 2009, when Braintree Sixth Form opened for 16- to 19-year-old students. In August 2009, the school became an academy.

Notley High School is the lead partner in the Braintree Sixth Form, which is a purpose-built post-16 provision for the youth of Braintree. It opened in September 2009 admitting students from Notley High School and other local schools.

Recent Ofsted visits reported the school as “inadequate”.

Notable former pupils and staff
Olly Murs, singer-songwriter, musician and television presenter.
Louie Spence, dancer and reality TV star
Giles Long, Paralympic Swimmer.
Beans On Toast (musician)

Academic results 
In 2019, Notley High School had a Progress 8 score of -0.38, which is below average for secondary schools in the United Kingdom. The pass rate for English & Maths GCSE was 36%.

Braintree Sixth Form had a progress score of 0.23 which is below average, and an average A Level grade of C−. Over 11% of students did not complete their study programme at the Sixth Form.

References

External links
Notley High School official website

Academies in Essex
Secondary schools in Essex
Braintree, Essex